James George Eayrs  (13 October 1926 – 6 February 2021) was a Canadian historian.

Biography
Eayrs won the Governor General's Award for English-language non-fiction at the 1965 Governor General's Awards for his book In Defence of Canada: From the Great War to the Great Depression. The book, which examined Canadian military and defence policy during the period between the First World War and the Great Depression, was the first in a multi-volume series on Canadian military history and was followed by In Defence of Canada, Vol. 2: Appeasement and Rearmament (1965), In Defence of Canada: Peacemaking and Deterrence (1972), In Defence of Canada: Growing Up Allied (1980) and In Defence of Canada: Indochina, Roots of Complicity (1983).

A professor of history at the University of Toronto and later at Dalhousie University, he was awarded the Canada Council Molson Prize in 1984 and was named a fellow of the Royal Society of Canada.

His wife, Elizabeth Eayrs, sat on Toronto City Council from 1972 to 1978.

References

1926 births
2021 deaths
20th-century Canadian historians
20th-century Canadian non-fiction writers
20th-century Canadian male writers
Alumni of the London School of Economics
Canadian male non-fiction writers
Columbia University alumni
Academic staff of the Dalhousie University
Fellows of the Royal Society of Canada
Governor General's Award-winning non-fiction writers
University of Toronto alumni
Academic staff of the University of Toronto